Veronica dillenii, commonly known as Dillenius' speedwell, is a species of flowering plant in the speedwell genus Veronica, family Plantaginaceae. It is found in warmer parts of Europe, the Caucasus region, and on to Kazakhstan, and it has been introduced to the eastern United States; Wisconsin, Illinois, Indiana, Michigan, New York, and Virginia. Considered somewhat weedy, it does not persist in fields under intensive agriculture.

References

dillenii
Flora of Spain
Flora of France
Flora of Central Europe
Flora of Southeastern Europe
Flora of Belarus
Flora of Ukraine
Flora of the Crimean Peninsula
Flora of South European Russia
Flora of the Caucasus
Flora of Turkey
Flora of Kazakhstan
Plants described in 1769